Zhdeniievo is an urban-type settlement in Mukachevo Raion of Zakarpattia Oblast (province) in western Ukraine. Zhdeniievo's population was 1,128 as of the 2001 Ukrainian Census. Current population: .

References

Urban-type settlements in Mukachevo Raion
Populated places established in 1981